The following article presents a summary of the 1908 football (soccer) season in Brazil, which was the 7th season of competitive football in the country.

Campeonato Paulista

Final Standings

Paulistano declared as the Campeonato Paulista champions.

State championship champions

References

 Brazilian competitions at RSSSF

 
Seasons in Brazilian football
Brazil